Etxaniz is a Basque surname. Notable people with the surname include:

 Javier Etxaniz (born 1970), Spanish sprint canoeist
 Josu Etxaniz (born 1985), Spanish footballer

Basque-language surnames